Jason Shevchuk is an American singer and guitarist for the band None More Black. None More Black announced an indefinite hiatus in 2007 but later regrouped. On May 20, 2008, None More Black announced that they were back with a singular show scheduled for July 4, 2008, in Philadelphia.

He is the former singer for Kid Dynamite and singer and guitarist for LaGrecia. Before Kid Dynamite, he was the vocalist for screamo band "Bound."

Shevchuk became the vocalist of Kid Dynamite after winning an audition with his melodic yet abrasive voice and catchy "whoa-whoa-whoas".

He left Kid Dynamite in 2000 to pursue film editing work. His first film, Ghetto Venue, was about the recently closed Philadelphia club Stalag 13. He still edits film and has worked on music videos with None More Black and other bands, such as The Loved Ones. However, his musical urges led to the birth of his next band, None More Black.

Shevchuck started to write and record his own solo material under the name OnGuard.  As of early June 2007, the OnGuard MySpace page all but vanished, with all songs and pictures/information removed. However, later he put up a website which has the project's entire discography.

Shevchuk emerged on MySpace with the band LaGrecia saying OnGuard is "officially dead" and changed its name while becoming a full band including Dana Berkowitz on drums and Sal Dell'Aquila on bass. The band released their first and only album, "On Parallels," on June 24, 2008, on Suburban Home Records. The cover artwork for the album was done by Dell'Aquila. The band broke up just before the release of "On Parallels."

Consequently, LaGrecia's remaining duo of Sal and Dana announced via the band's MySpace account that Shevchuk had left the band and the LaGrecia project was finished.

Released the album "Old Youth" with the band Former Member in 2018.

References

External links

American rock guitarists
American male guitarists
American punk rock singers
Living people
Year of birth missing (living people)